The scrub hare (Lepus saxatilis) is one of two species of hares found in southern Namibia, Mozambique, South Africa, Eswatini and Lesotho. Although it is listed as a least concern species, the population has been declining and is expected to decline by 20% over the next 100 years.

Description
The scrub hare has a very distinct coloration. On the dorsal side of the hare, the fur is grizzled-gray with small black spots. The ventral side of the fur is all white. Scrub hares have a small, stubby tail with the topside being black and the underside being white. What makes Lepus saxatilis different from the other subspecies is the patch of red-brown fur it has behind its ears. They have long ears that are normally perched up that are gray, and together with its tail make it most visible when it is running from predators.

The scrub hare has a very large range in its body size and body mass compared to most animals. This large range is specific to the scrub hare because of its different geographical ranges. Hares that live in more southern latitudes decrease in body size and those that live in more northern latitudes have larger body sizes. Females are typically larger than males.

Geographic distribution
The scrub hare is endemic to southern Africa. They are most commonly found in southern Namibia, South Africa, Eswatini and Lesotho. However, they have been spotted in southeast Ethiopia, southwest Mauritania, Senegal, Uganda, Kenya, Angola, Zambia, Malawi, Nigeria, Zimbabwe, and Mozambique. However, the scrub hare is not found in the Namib desert.

Habitat
Scrub hares are normally found at higher elevations at about 1220 m to 1830 m. They are primarily found in scrub, tall grasslands and savanna woodlands. However, at night they can be seen in open grasslands. They are never seen in forests or deserts. They have also been known to adapt to agriculturally developed lands.

They are also found throughout two different biomes, tropical and sub-tropical.

Ecosystem roles
The scrub hare has many roles in the ecosystem. They are responsible for a small amount of soil aeration, which helps redistribute the soil when they are creating their indentations and their forms. An indentation or form is when the hare burrows itself into the ground so that an ‘indent’ forms where it perfectly molds to their body. They also are prey for other animals. They are also a host for many types of  fleas and lice. The predominant flea parasite species that can be found on the scrub hare is the Ctenocephalides felis damarensis.

Behavior
The scrub hare is a solitary creature. The sexes are only seen together for mating purposes. They are also nocturnal and are seen foraging at night. However, if the weather is overcast, they will come out earlier. During the day they create a small indent in the ground and lie flat in a motionless form with their ears tucked back to their shoulders. As long as they remain motionless, predators cannot detect them because their coloration blends in with the scrubland and vegetation.

Diet
The scrub hare is an herbivore and eats mostly green grasses. During times of drought when green grass is less prevalent, they will indulge in leaves, stems, and rhizomes of grass. When even those are hard to come by they will eat shrub bark to survive.

Reproduction
They are polygynous. When a female is experiencing oestrus, many males will surround her in hopes to mate with her. To win the female over, the males will usually compete through ‘boxing’ with their forefeet or kicking with their hind legs. Sometimes the female even gets injured during these fights because the competition is so fierce between the males.

They can breed throughout the year, but their peak season is during the summer months of September to February. The gestation period is about 42 days and a female gives birth anywhere from 1 to 3 ‘leverets’ at a time. They can have as many as 4 litters per year. It has also been proven that a female is more likely to give birth to triplets after a rainy season. However, their peak time for births is during the summer. The average age for a male and female to reach reproduction age is 1 year.

Parenting style
Mothers invest little time with parenting for their young. The young are born fully haired, open-eyed, and are basically developed enough to take care of themselves. Although the time until independence is unknown, parents do not provide protection or resources and give them no learning experience. There is some suckling at night, but it does not last for many days.

Lifespan
Many scrub hares do not even survive their first year. However, they have been noted that in the wild, these hares survive about 5 years. In captivity, they have lived to be between 6 and 7.

Threats

Conservation status
As of now the scrub hare is listed as a least concern animal and is widespread in southern Africa.[2] Within the next 100 years, their population is estimated to decrease a further 20%.

Predation
The scrub hare does have a few known predators. One of the most pronounced predators is the side-striped jackal, Canis adustus. Another known predator is the cheetah, Acinonyx jubatus. Some less prominent predators are predatory birds and the caracal, Caracal caracal. The scrub hare does not have a large defense against predators. Its most notable is the coloring of its fur. It can act as a camouflage against rugged terrain. When a predator is near, it remains completely motionless, hoping it is not spotted. But at the last possible moment when the predator is near, the scrub hare uses its long hind legs to jump and run away as fast as it can. It runs in a zigzagged formation in hopes it will be difficult for the predator to catch it. However, when it is caught it makes a loud squeal for distress and its last line of defense is to kick or bite, which is usually unsuccessful.

Human pressures
Habitat fragmentation, commercial plantations and development threaten the species because it destroys their habitats and leaves them exposed to predators. Hunting is also becoming an issue for the scrub hare. Many local people hunt the hare for food and sometimes create gloves out of their soft, warm fur. There has been a distinct population decline due to hunting in KwaZulu-Natal, South Africa.

References

scrub hare
Mammals of Southern Africa
scrub hare
scrub hare